Archimandrite Cyril (secular name Ivan Dmitrievich Pavlov, ; 8 September 1919 – 20 February 2017) was a Russian Orthodox Christian mystic, elder, wonder-worker and Archimandrite, who was confessor to Patriarch Alexy II. He was also confessor to the previous patriarchs Alexy I and Pimen.

Biography
Ivan Dmitrievich Pavlov was born September 8th,  1919 in Makovskiye Vyselki, Ryazan Oblast, to a peasant family.  After finishing at a polytechnical college, he worked as a technician at a metallurgic plant. Pavlov served in the military during World War II, active for six years, starting in the Soviet-Finnish War; he also took part in the Battle of Stalingrad. He was awarded the medal and title of "Hero of the Soviet Union" for his part in the defense of Stalingrad.

As a soldier, Pavlov reached Austria and participated in the battles at Lake Balaton. In 1946 he was demobilised in Hungary and came to Moscow.

Conversion 
In one of the most bloody days lieutenant Pavlov found among the ruins the Gospel, opened, started reading and took it as a sign from above. He collected all the pages of the Gospel and never abandoned them. In one of the interviews he recollected, "When I started reading the Gospel – my eyes got opened upon everything surrounding me, upon all the events... I walked with the Gospel and was not afraid. Never. Such was the inspiration! Simply God was next to me and I was not afraid of anything...".

In 1946 Pavlov went to Yelokhovo Cathedral and, after asking for any theological institute, he was sent to the newly opened theological seminary at Novodevichy monastery. He arrived there in the military outfit and was gladly met by pro-rector Father Sergius. Thus the sergeant became the seminarian. Having finished the seminary, he studied at the Moscow Theological Academy and in 1953 took postrig becoming a monk, refusing the glory and awards. He completed the academy in 1954, by now not Ivan Dmitrievich Pavlov but hieromonk Cyril.  Father Cyril lived at Trinity-Sergius lavra and became brotherly spiritual guide to the monks.

Later life and death

Until his death father Cyril lived in Peredelkino, in the residence of the Holy Patriarch of all Russia Aleksy II.

Archimandrite Cyril died on 20 February 2017 at the age of 97.

Teaching
Pavlov encouraged people to work on perfecting themselves, studying, working on themselves as long as Lord gives time one needs to fight with one's own sinful inclinations, one's own vices, removing from one's soul all what is evil, bad, viceful as no one knows neither day or time of Christ coming.

References

External links
 Komsomolskaya Pravda about elder Cyril (in Russian)
 The Elder Cyril (Pavlov) About Our Times. Said January 10, 2001 (decoding of tape recording) - in Russian
 Elder Cyril's Easter Homily (in Russian)
 Audio recordings of Cyril's homilies (in Russian)
 Elder Cyril's photo

1919 births
2017 deaths
People from Mikhaylovsky District, Ryazan Oblast
Eastern Orthodox mystics
Russian Eastern Orthodox priests
Russian Orthodox monks
20th-century Eastern Orthodox priests
20th-century Christian mystics
Soviet military personnel of World War II
20th-century Christian monks
21st-century Christian monks
Archimandrites